Banana language may refer to

 the hypothetical Proto-Euphratean language(s)
 a pejorative name for the Massa and Musey languages
 the fictional language spoken by the Minion characters in the Despicable Me media franchise, also known as "Minionese"